Bani Hasan is a town in western Libya lying on the coast of the Mediterranean Sea.

Transport 

It is proposed to be served by a station on the national railway network, under construction in 2009.

See also 
Railway stations in Libya

References 

Populated places in Murqub District